Dushanbe International Airport  is an international airport in Dushanbe, the capital of Tajikistan. It is the main hub for Somon Air and is the home base for Tajik Air, which also has its headquarters on the property.

History
In 1924, the first airport was built in the country, in the city currently known as Dushanbe. In November 1929, a new airport was built to serve Stalinabad (past name of Dushanbe). In 1964, the current airport complex was put into operation. Over the years, the airport has been reconstructed several times.

On September 7, 1992, during the first months of the Tajikistani Civil War, President Rahmon Nabiyev and an entourage of his were on their way to the airport when they were ambushed by opposition forces. At the terminal, Nabiyev was forced to resign, practically at gunpoint, after a meeting and discussions with the armed opposition in the VIP lounge, before being released. Tanks and troops were reportedly stationed at the terminal during the whole ordeal.

A new French-built terminal, which can serve 1.5 million passengers a year, was opened on 3 September 2014. France provided Tajikistan a long-term, low-interest €20 million loan. Tajikistan's own contribution was €19 million.

Airlines and destinations

Statistics

See also 
Transport in Tajikistan
List of the busiest airports in the former USSR

References

External links 
 www.airport.tj 

Airports in Tajikistan
Airports built in the Soviet Union
Buildings and structures in Dushanbe
Airports established in 1964
1964 establishments in Tajikistan